An IPCS Health and Safety Guide is a monograph prepared by the International Programme on Chemical Safety (IPCS) and published by the World Health Organization (WHO). They aim to provide "concise information in non-technical language, for decision-makers on risks from exposure to chemicals, with practical advice on medical and administrative issues." Just over 100 HSGs have been published.

An HSG usually accompanies an Environmental Health Criteria (EHC) monograph. The two documents cover similar material, but the HSG is much shorter and unreferenced (citations to the original sources can be found in the corresponding EHC).

References

External links
INCHEM.org, List of IPCS Health and Safety Guides
INCHEM.org, Users' manual for the IPCS Health and Safety Guides

Chemical safety